Hraunhafnartangi Lighthouse (regionally also ) is the northernmost lighthouse in Iceland.  It is located about 800 meters south of the Arctic Circle.

Location and description 
The lighthouse is on the northeast coast of Iceland, about 10 km northwest of the town of Raufarhöfn, the northernmost town in Iceland.  The light tower is square, 19 metres tall and built of concrete.  The lantern house is painted red.

Light characteristic 
The light characteristic is a long and a short flash every 30 seconds.  The flash is white or red depending on the direction from the lighthouse.

See also 

 List of lighthouses in Iceland

References

External links 
 

Lighthouses completed in 1951
Lighthouses in Iceland
North Iceland